"Girls Just Wanna Have Fun" is a song by reggae musician Shaggy, featuring American rapper Eve. The song was released as the official lead, and second overall single, from Shaggy's eleventh studio album, Rise. The song samples "Girls Just Want to Have Fun" by Cyndi Lauper.

The single was released in Germany and throughout Europe on 24 August 2012. The accompanying music video was directed by Ras Kassa, and was released via YouTube on 14 July 2012. The single found chart success in both Germany and Poland.

Track listing
 "Girls Just Wanna Have Fun" (Single Mix) – 3:26 
 "Girls Just Wanna Have Fun" (Extended Mix)  
 "Girls Just Wanna Have Fun" (Voodoo & Serano Mix Edit) 
 "Girls Just Wanna Have Fun" (Voodoo & Serano Remix)   
 "Girls Just Wanna Have Fun" (Remady Remix)  
 "Girls Just Wanna Have Fun" (Remady Extended Mix)

Charts

Release history

References

2012 singles
Shaggy (musician) songs
Dancehall songs
Eve (rapper) songs
2012 songs
Songs written by Robert Hazard
MCA Records singles
Songs written by Shaggy (musician)